Filip Prokopyszyn (born 10 August 2000) is a Polish professional racing cyclist, who currently rides for UCI Continental team . In October 2019, he won the bronze medal in the men's elimination race event at the 2019 UEC European Track Championships.

Major results

2017
 2nd  Scratch, UCI Junior Track World Championships
 2nd  Scratch, UEC European Junior Championships
2018
 UCI Junior Track World Championships
2nd  Scratch
2nd  Points race
 UEC European Junior Championships
2nd  Scratch
3rd  Madison (with Damian Papierski)
3rd  Kilometer
2019
 National Track Championships
1st  Madison (with Daniel Staniszewski)
1st  Elimination race
 2nd  Scratch, European Games
 3rd  Elimination, UEC European Track Championships
2020
 1st  Elimination race, National Track Championships
 3rd  Madison (with Bartosz Rudyk), UEC European Under-23 Championships
2022
 3rd  Elimination race, UEC European Under-23 Championships

References

External links

2000 births
Living people
Polish male cyclists
Polish track cyclists
People from Zielona Góra
Cyclists at the 2019 European Games
European Games medalists in cycling
European Games silver medalists for Poland
21st-century Polish people